The Gotham Book Prize is awarded annually to a fiction or non-fiction work judged the best about or set in New York City.  The award was founded by Bradley Tusk and Howard Wolfson.

Winners

References

External Links

 Official website

American literary awards
21st-century literary awards
Awards established in 2021